The Tahquamenon Falls (  or  ) are a series of waterfalls on the Tahquamenon River, shortly before it empties into Lake Superior, in the northeastern Upper Peninsula of Michigan. They are the largest waterfalls in Michigan, and one of the largest in the eastern half of North America. The water is noticeably brown in color from the tannins leached from the cedar swamps which the river drains, leading to the nickname "Root Beer Falls". The falls are within Tahquamenon Falls State Park, between the towns of Newberry and Paradise, and are a popular tourist destination during all seasons.

The falls are divided into the Upper and Lower Falls. The island can be reached by rowboat from the basin below the Lower Falls, or by a foot bridge constructed in 2022.

The falls take their name from the river, which appears to come from Tahquamenon Island in Whitefish Bay, near the mouth of the river; the first written record of the name identifies the island as "Outakouaminan" in a 1671 French map. The Tahquamenon River is mentioned by name in Longfellow's 1855 epic poem The Song of Hiawatha, as the protagonist builds a birch-bark canoe "In the solitary forest, By the rushing Taquamenaw". A song by Sufjan Stevens on his album Michigan is titled after Tahquamenon Falls.

Photo gallery

References

External links

Protected areas of Luce County, Michigan
Waterfalls of Michigan
Landforms of Luce County, Michigan